This is an incomplete list of Statutory Rules of Northern Ireland in 2011.

1-100 

 The Student Fees (Amounts) (Amendment) Regulations (Northern Ireland) 2011 (S.R. 2011 No. 1)
 The Solvent Emissions (Amendment) Regulations (Northern Ireland) 2011 (S.R. 2011 No. 2)
 The Motor Vehicles (Approval) (Amendment) Regulations (Northern Ireland) 2011 (S.R. 2011 No. 3)
 Public Health Acts Amendment Act 1907 (Application of sections 82 and 83 to North Down Borough Council) Order (Northern Ireland) 2011 (S.R. 2011 No. 4)
 Public Health Acts Amendment Act 1907 (Application of sections 82 and 83 to Coleraine Borough Council) Order (Northern Ireland) 2011 (S.R. 2011 No. 5)
 Public Health Acts Amendment Act 1907 (Application of sections 82 and 83 to Down District Council) Order (Northern Ireland) 2011 (S.R. 2011 No. 6)
 Public Health Acts Amendment Act 1907 (Application of sections 82 and 83 to Carrickfergus Borough Council) Order (Northern Ireland) 2011 (S.R. 2011 No. 7)
 The Parking Places (Disabled Persons’ Vehicles) (Amendment) Order (Northern Ireland) 2011 (S.R. 2011 No. 8)
 Biomass Processing Challenge Fund (Amendment) Regulations (Northern Ireland) 2011 (S.R. 2011 No. 9)
 The Water Framework Directive (Priority Substances and Classification) Regulations (Northern Ireland) 2011 (S.R. 2011 No. 10)
 The Charities (2008 Act) (Commencement No. 3) Order (Northern Ireland) 2011 (S.R. 2011 No. 11 (C. 1))
 The Charities Act 2008 (Transitional Provision) Order (Northern Ireland) 2011 (S.R. 2011 No. 12)
 The Debt Relief (2010 Act) (Commencement) Order (Northern Ireland) 2011 (S.R. 2011 No. 13 (C. 2))
 The Insolvency (Fees) (Amendment) Order (Northern Ireland) 2011 (S.R. 2011 No. 14)
 The Debt Relief Orders (Designation of Competent Authorities) Regulations (Northern Ireland) 2011 (S.R. 2011 No. 15)
 Rates (Amendment) (2009 Act) (Commencement No. 2) Order (Northern Ireland) 2011 (S.R. 2011 No. 16 (C. 3))
 The Regulation and Improvement Authority (Independent Health Care) (Fees and Frequency of Inspections) (Amendment) Regulations (Northern Ireland) 2011 (S.R. 2011 No. 17)
 The Motor Vehicle Testing (Electronic Communications) Order (Northern Ireland) 2011 (S.R. 2011 No. 18)
 The Road Traffic (Amendment) (1991 Order) (Commencement No. 2) Order (Northern Ireland) 2011 (S.R. 2011 No. 19 (C. 4))
 The Motor Vehicles (Construction and Use) (Amendment) Regulations (Northern Ireland) 2011 (S.R. 2011 No. 20)
 The Motor Vehicles (Driving Licences) (Amendment) Regulations (Northern Ireland) 2011 (S.R. 2011 No. 21)
 The Plant Health (Amendment) Order (Northern Ireland) 2011 (S.R. 2011 No. 22)
 The Motor Vehicles (Electronic Communication of Certificates of Insurance) Order (Northern Ireland) 2011 (S.R. 2011 No. 23)
 The Motor Vehicles (Third-Party Risks) (Amendment) Regulations (Northern Ireland) 2011 (S.R. 2011 No. 24)
 The Fishing Boats (Electronic Transmission of Fishing Activities Data) Scheme (Northern Ireland) 2011 (S.R. 2011 No. 25)
 The Social Security (Work-focused Interviews etc.) (Equalisation of State Pension Age) (Amendment) Regulations (Northern Ireland) 2011 (S.R. 2011 No. 26)
 The Animals and Animal Products (Import and Export) (Amendment) Regulations (Northern Ireland) 2011 (S.R. 2011 No. 27)
 The Plastic Materials and Articles in Contact with Food (Amendment) Regulations (Northern Ireland) 2011 (S.R. 2011 No. 28)
 The Food (Jelly Mini-Cups) (Emergency Control) (Revocation) Regulations (Northern Ireland) 2011 (S.R. 2011 No. 29)
 The Employment Rights (Increase of Limits) Order (Northern Ireland) 2011 (S.R. 2011 No. 30)
 Electricity (Guarantees of Origin of Electricity Produced from Renewable Energy Sources) (Amendment) Regulations (Northern Ireland) 2011 (S.R. 2011 No. 31)
 The Tullyrain Road (Route A26), Banbridge (Abandonment) Order (Northern Ireland) 2011 (S.R. 2011 No. 32)
 The Back Street at Carrick Hill and Library Street, Belfast (Abandonment) Order (Northern Ireland) 2011 (S.R. 2011 No. 33)
 The Candahar Street, Belfast (Abandonment) Order (Northern Ireland) 2011 (S.R. 2011 No. 34)
 The Strangford Lough (Sea Fishing Exclusion Zones) Regulations (Northern Ireland) 2011 (S.R. 2011 No. 35)
 Rates (Unoccupied Hereditaments) Regulations (Northern Ireland) 2011 (S.R. 2011 No. 36)
 The Bramblewood Grove, Banbridge (Footway) (Abandonment) Order (Northern Ireland) 2011 (S.R. 2011 No. 37)
 The Vegetable Seeds (Amendment) Regulations (Northern Ireland) 2011 (S.R. 2011 No. 38)
 The Food Additives (Amendment) Regulations (Northern Ireland) 2011 (S.R. 2011 No. 39)
 Categories of Tourist Establishment Order (Northern Ireland) 2011 (S.R. 2011 No. 40)
 The Healthy Start Scheme and Day Care Food Scheme (Amendment) Regulations (Northern Ireland) 2011 (S.R. 2011 No. 41)
 Rates (Completion Notices) (Financial Adjustments) Regulations (Northern Ireland) 2011 (S.R. 2011 No. 42)
 The Rate Relief (Amendment) Regulations (Northern Ireland) 2011 (S.R. 2011 No. 43)
 Departments (Transfer of Functions) Order (Northern Ireland) 2011 (S.R. 2011 No. 44)
 The Food Labelling (Declaration of Allergens) Regulations (Northern Ireland) 2011 (S.R. 2011 No. 45)
 Reporting of Prices of Milk Products (Amendment) Regulations (Northern Ireland) 2011 (S.R. 2011 No. 46)
 The Fruit Juices and Fruit Nectars (Amendment) Regulations (Northern Ireland) 2011 (S.R. 2011 No. 47)
 The Official Feed and Food Controls (Amendment) Regulations (Northern Ireland) 2011 (S.R. 2011 No. 48)
 The Road Vehicles Lighting (Amendment) Regulations (Northern Ireland) 2011 (S.R. 2011 No. 49)
 Police Service of Northern Ireland and Police Service of Northern Ireland Reserve (Full-Time) (Amendment) Regulations 2011 (S.R. 2011 No. 50)
 The Housing Benefit (Amendment) Regulations (Northern Ireland) 2011 (S.R. 2011 No. 51)
 The Social Security Pensions (Low Earnings Threshold) Order (Northern Ireland) 2011 (S.R. 2011 No. 52)
 The Natural Mineral Water, Spring Water and Bottled Drinking Water (Amendment) Regulations (Northern Ireland) 2011 (S.R. 2011 No. 53)
 The Introductory Tenancies (Disposal of Houses) Order (Northern Ireland) 2011 (S.R. 2011 No. 54)
 The Misuse of Drugs (Licence Fees) Regulations (Northern Ireland) 2011 (S.R. 2011 No. 55)
 The Departments (Transfer of Functions) (No. 2) Order (Northern Ireland) 2011 (S.R. 2011 No. 56)
 The Rates (Housing Executive) Order (Northern Ireland) 2011 (S.R. 2011 No. 57)
 The County Court (Amendment) Rules (Northern Ireland) 2011 (S.R. 2011 No. 58)
 The Magistrates’ Courts (Amendment) Rules (Northern Ireland) 2011 (S.R. 2011 No. 59)
 The Magistrates’ Courts (Criminal Justice (Children)) (Amendment) Rules (Northern Ireland) 2011 (S.R. 2011 No. 60)
 The Magistrates’ Courts (Children (Northern Ireland) Order 1995) (Amendment) Rules (Northern Ireland) 2011 (S.R. 2011 No. 61)
 The Rules of the Court of Judicature (Northern Ireland) (Amendment) 2011 (S.R. 2011 No. 62)
 The Seed Potatoes (Crop Fees) Regulations (Northern Ireland) 2011 (S.R. 2011 No. 63)
 The Family Proceedings (Amendment) Rules (Northern Ireland) 2011 (S.R. 2011 No. 64)
 The County Courts (Financial Limits) Order (Northern Ireland) 2011 (S.R. 2011 No. 65)
 The Social Security Revaluation of Earnings Factors Order (Northern Ireland) 2011 (S.R. 2011 No. 66)
 The Pneumoconiosis, etc., (Workers’ Compensation) (Payment of Claims) (Amendment) Regulations (Northern Ireland) 2011 (S.R. 2011 No. 67)
 The Mesothelioma Lump Sum Payments (Conditions and Amounts) (Amendment) Regulations (Northern Ireland) 2011 (S.R. 2011 No. 68)
 The City of Derry Airport (Control Over Land) Order (Northern Ireland) 2011 (S.R. 2011 No. 69)
 The Student Fees (Qualifying Courses and Persons) (Amendment) Regulations (Northern Ireland) 2011 (S.R. 2011 No. 70)
 The Zoonoses (Fees) Regulations (Northern Ireland) 2011 (S.R. 2011 No. 71)
 The Rates (Regional Rates) Order (Northern Ireland) 2011 (S.R. 2011 No. 72)
 The Rates (Industrial Hereditaments) (Specified Percentage) Order (Northern Ireland) 2011 (S.R. 2011 No. 73)
 The Trunk Road T8 (Randalstown to Toome) Order (Northern Ireland) 2011 (S.R. 2011 No. 74)
 The Planning (General Development) (Amendment) Order (Northern Ireland) 2011 (S.R. 2011 No. 75)
 The Employment and Support Allowance (Limited Capability for Work and Limited Capability for Work-related Activity) (Amendment) Regulations (Northern Ireland) 2011 (S.R. 2011 No. 76)
 The Marine Licensing (Application Fees) Regulations (Northern Ireland) 2011 (S.R. 2011 No. 77)
 The Marine Licensing (Exempted Activities) Order (Northern Ireland) 2011 (S.R. 2011 No. 78)
 The Marine Licensing (Register of Licensing Information) Regulations (Northern Ireland) 2011 (S.R. 2011 No. 79)
 The Marine Licensing (Appeals) Regulations (Northern Ireland) 2011 (S.R. 2011 No. 80)
 The Marine Licensing (Civil Sanctions) Order (Northern Ireland) 2011 (S.R. 2011 No. 81)
 The Whole of Government Accounts (Designation of Bodies) Order (Northern Ireland) 2011 (S.R. 2011 No. 82)
 The Parking Places, Loading Bays and Waiting Restrictions (Armagh) (Amendment) Order (Northern Ireland) 2011 (S.R. 2011 No. 83)
 The Cycle Lanes (Glengall Street and Great Victoria Street, Belfast) (Amendment) Order (Northern Ireland) 2011 (S.R. 2011 No. 84)
 The One-Way Traffic (Belfast) (Amendment) Order (Northern Ireland) 2011 (S.R. 2011 No. 85)
 The Misuse of Drugs (Safe Custody) (Amendment) Regulations (Northern Ireland) 2011 (S.R. 2011 No. 86)
 The Parking Places on Roads (Disabled Persons’ Vehicles) (Amendment) Order (Northern Ireland) 2011 (S.R. 2011 No. 87)
 The Parking Places (Disabled Persons’ Vehicles) (Amendment No. 2) Order (Northern Ireland) 2011 (S.R. 2011 No. 88)
 The Occupational and Personal Pension Schemes (Miscellaneous Amendments) Regulations (Northern Ireland) 2011 (S.R. 2011 No. 89)
 The Social Security (Claims and Payments) (Amendment) Regulations (Northern Ireland) 2011 (S.R. 2011 No. 90)
 The Rate Relief (Low-Carbon Homes Scheme) (Revocation and Savings) Regulations (Northern Ireland) 2011 (S.R. 2011 No. 91)
 The Rate Relief (Energy Efficiency Homes Scheme) (Revocation and Savings) Regulations (Northern Ireland) 2011 (S.R. 2011 No. 92)
 The Loading Bays on Roads (Amendment) Order (Northern Ireland) 2011 (S.R. 2011 No. 93)
 The Road Vehicles Lighting (Amendment No. 2) Regulations (Northern Ireland) 2011 (S.R. 2011 No. 94)
 The Energy (2011 Act) (Commencement) Order (Northern Ireland) 2011 (S.R. 2011 No. 95 (C. 5))
 The Waiting Restrictions (Newry) Order (Northern Ireland) 2011 (S.R. 2011 No. 96)
 The Seed Potatoes (Tuber Inspection Fees) (Amendment) Regulations (Northern Ireland) 2011 (S.R. 2011 No. 97)
 The Trunk Road T8 (Toome to Castledawson) Order (Northern Ireland) 2011 (S.R. 2011 No. 98)
 The Planning (Fees) (Amendment) Regulations (Northern Ireland) 2011 (S.R. 2011 No. 99)
 The County Court (Amendment No. 2) Rules (Northern Ireland) 2011 (S.R. 2011 No. 100)

101-200 

 The Landfill (Amendment) Regulations (Northern Ireland) 2011 (S.R. 2011 No. 101)
 The Loading Bays on Roads (Amendment No. 2) Order (Northern Ireland) 2011 (S.R. 2011 No. 102)
 The Recovery of Health Services Charges (Amounts) (Amendment) Regulations (Northern Ireland) 2011 (S.R. 2011 No. 103)
 Categories of Tourist Establishment (Statutory Criteria) (Amendment) Regulations (Northern Ireland) 2011 (S.R. 2011 No. 104)
 Statutory Inspection of Tourist Establishments (Fees) Regulations (Northern Ireland) 2011 (S.R. 2011 No. 105)
 Tourism (Amendment) (2011 Act) (Commencement No. 1) Order (Northern Ireland) 2011 (S.R. 2011 No. 106 (C. 6))
 The National Insurance Contributions Credits (Miscellaneous Amendments) Regulations (Northern Ireland) 2011 (S.R. 2011 No. 107)
 The Pensions (2008 No. 2 Act) (Commencement No. 5) Order (Northern Ireland) 2011 (S.R. 2011 No. 108 (C. 7))
 Social Security (Deferral of Retirement Pensions) Regulations (Northern Ireland) 2011 (S.R. 2011 No. 109)
 The Insolvency (Monetary Limits) (Amendment) Order (Northern Ireland) 2011 (S.R. 2011 No. 110)
 The Debt Relief (2010 Act) (Transitional Provision) Order (Northern Ireland) 2011 (S.R. 2011 No. 111)
 The Guaranteed Minimum Pensions Increase Order (Northern Ireland) 2011 (S.R. 2011 No. 112)
 The Pension Protection Fund (Pension Compensation Sharing and Attachment on Divorce etc.) Regulations (Northern Ireland) 2011 (S.R. 2011 No. 113)
 The Pension Protection Fund (Pensions on Divorce etc.: Charges) Regulations (Northern Ireland) 2011 (S.R. 2011 No. 114)
 The Supervision and Treatment Orders (Maximum Period) Order (Northern Ireland) 2011 (S.R. 2011 No. 115)
 Superannuation (Office of the Director and Deputy Director of Public Prosecutions) Order (Northern Ireland) 2011 (S.R. 2011 No. 116)
 Local Government Pension Scheme (Councillors) (Amendment) Regulations (Northern Ireland) 2011 (S.R. 2011 No. 117)
 The Aquatic Animal Health (Amendment) Regulations (Northern Ireland) 2011 (S.R. 2011 No. 118)
 The Social Security Benefits Up-rating Order (Northern Ireland) 2011 (S.R. 2011 No. 119)
 The Social Security Benefits Up-rating Regulations (Northern Ireland) 2011 (S.R. 2011 No. 120)
 The Social Security (Industrial Injuries) (Dependency) (Permitted Earnings Limits) Order (Northern Ireland) 2011 (S.R. 2011 No. 121)
 The Occupational Pension Schemes (Levy Ceiling) Order (Northern Ireland) 2011 (S.R. 2011 No. 122)
 The Pension Protection Fund (Pension Compensation Cap) Order (Northern Ireland) 2011 (S.R. 2011 No. 123)
 The Animal By-Products (Enforcement) Regulations (Northern Ireland) 2011 (S.R. 2011 No. 124)
 The Off-Street Parking (Amendment) Order (Northern Ireland) 2011 (S.R. 2011 No. 125)
 The On-Street Parking (Amendment) Order (Northern Ireland) 2011 (S.R. 2011 No. 126)
 The Waste Regulations (Northern Ireland) 2011 (S.R. 2011 No. 127)
 Pensions Increase (Modification) Regulations (Northern Ireland) 2011 (S.R. 2011 No. 128)
 Pensions Increase (Review) Order (Northern Ireland) 2011 (S.R. 2011 No. 129)
 The Social Fund Maternity and Funeral Expenses (General) (Amendment) Regulations (Northern Ireland) 2011 (S.R. 2011 No. 130)
 The Control of Traffic (Belfast) Order (Northern Ireland) 2011 (S.R. 2011 No. 131)
 The Parking Places on Roads (Belfast) Order (Northern Ireland) 2011 (S.R. 2011 No. 132)
 The One-Way Traffic (Belfast) (Amendment No. 2) Order (Northern Ireland) 2011 (S.R. 2011 No. 133)
 The Rail Passengers’ Rights and Obligations (Exemptions) Regulations (Northern Ireland) 2011 (S.R. 2011 No. 134)
 The Social Security (Miscellaneous Amendments) Regulations (Northern Ireland) 2011 (S.R. 2011 No. 135)
 The Housing Benefit (Miscellaneous Amendments) Regulations (Northern Ireland) 2011 (S.R. 2011 No. 136)
 The Education (Student Loans) (Repayment) (Amendment) Regulations (Northern Ireland) 2011 (S.R. 2011 No. 137)
 The Waiting Restrictions (Londonderry) (Amendment) Order (Northern Ireland) 2011 (S.R. 2011 No. 138)
 The Waiting Restrictions (Kilkeel) Order (Northern Ireland) 2011 (S.R. 2011 No. 139)
 The Waiting Restrictions (Ballymoney) Order (Northern Ireland) 2011 (S.R. 2011 No. 140)
 Land Registration (Amendment) Rules (Northern Ireland) 2011 (S.R. 2011 No. 141)
 The Presbyterian Mutual Society (Financial Assistance to Members) Scheme Regulations (Northern Ireland) 2011 (S.R. 2011 No. 142)
 The Presbyterian Mutual Society Financial Assistance Scheme Regulations (Northern Ireland) 2011 (S.R. 2011 No. 143)
 The Clearway (Route A6, Glenshane Road, Maghera) Order (Northern Ireland) 2011 (S.R. 2011 No. 144)
 The One-Way Traffic (Londonderry) (Amendment) Order (Northern Ireland) 2011 (S.R. 2011 No. 145)
 The Traffic Weight Restriction (Church Place, Lurgan) Order (Northern Ireland) 2011 (S.R. 2011 No. 146)
 The Prohibition of Traffic (O’Neill’s Entry, Carnlough) Order (Northern Ireland) 2011 (S.R. 2011 No. 147)
 The Prohibition of Left-Hand Turn (Belfast) Order (Northern Ireland) 2011 (S.R. 2011 No. 148)
 The Waiting Restrictions (Ballymoney) (No. 2) Order (Northern Ireland) 2011 (S.R. 2011 No. 149)
 The Parking Places on Roads (Enniskillen) Order (Northern Ireland) 2011 (S.R. 2011 No. 150)
 The Insolvency (Amendment) Rules (Northern Ireland) 2011 (S.R. 2011 No. 151)
 The Legal Aid for Crown Court Proceedings (Costs) (Amendment) Rules (Northern Ireland) 2011 (S.R. 2011 No. 152)
 The Misuse of Drugs (Amendment) Regulations (Northern Ireland) 2011 (S.R. 2011 No. 153)
 The Misuse of Drugs (Designation) (Amendment) Order (Northern Ireland) 2011 (S.R. 2011 No. 154)
 The Gas and Electricity (Internal Markets) Regulations (Northern Ireland) 2011 (S.R. 2011 No. 155)
 The Sex Discrimination Order 1976 (Amendment) Regulations (Northern Ireland) 2011 (S.R. 2011 No. 156)
 The Cross-Border Mediation Regulations (Northern Ireland) 2011 (S.R. 2011 No. 157)
 Land Registration (Electronic Communications) Order (Northern Ireland) 2011 (S.R. 2011 No. 158)
 The Employment Act (Northern Ireland) 2011 (Commencement No. 1, Transitional Provisions and Savings) Order (Northern Ireland) 2011 (S.R. 2011 No. 159 (C. 8))
 The Code of Practice (Disciplinary and Grievance Procedures) (Appointed Day) Order (Northern Ireland) 2011 (S.R. 2011 No. 160)
 The Industrial Tribunals (Constitution and Rules of Procedure) (Amendment) Regulations (Northern Ireland) 2011 (S.R. 2011 No. 161)
 The Fair Employment Tribunal (Rules of Procedure) (Amendment) Regulations (Northern Ireland) 2011 (S.R. 2011 No. 162)
 The Transfer of Undertakings and Service Provision Change (Protection of Employment) (Amendment) Regulations (Northern Ireland) 2011 (S.R. 2011 No. 163)
 The Health and Social Services Trusts (Membership and Procedure) Amendment Regulations (Northern Ireland) 2011 (S.R. 2011 No. 164)
 The Regulation and Improvement Authority (Appointments and Procedure) (Amendment) Regulations (Northern Ireland) 2011 (S.R. 2011 No. 165)
 The Northern Ireland Medical and Dental Training Agency (Establishment and Constitution) (Amendment) Order (Northern Ireland) 2011 (S.R. 2011 No. 166)
 The Disability Discrimination Code of Practice (Provision and Use of Transport Vehicles) (Appointed Day) Order (Northern Ireland) 2011 (S.R. 2011 No. 167 (C. 9))
 The Employment Equality (Repeal of Retirement Age Provisions) Regulations (Northern Ireland) 2011 (S.R. 2011 No. 168)
 The Renewables Obligation (Amendment) Order (Northern Ireland) 2011 (S.R. 2011 No. 169)
 The Parking Places (Disabled Persons’ Vehicles) (Amendment No. 3) Order (Northern Ireland) 2011 (S.R. 2011 No. 170)
 The Waiting Restrictions (Markethill) Order (Northern Ireland) 2011 (S.R. 2011 No. 171)
 The Waiting Restrictions (Enniskillen) Order (Northern Ireland) 2011 (S.R. 2011 No. 172)
 The Taxis (Enniskillen) Order (Northern Ireland) 2011 (S.R. 2011 No. 173)
 The Road Races (Cookstown 100) Order (Northern Ireland) 2011 (S.R. 2011 No. 174)
 The Road Races (Drumhorc Hill Climb) Order (Northern Ireland) 2011 (S.R. 2011 No. 175)
 The Off-Street Parking (Amendment No. 2) Order (Northern Ireland) 2011 (S.R. 2011 No. 176)
 The Road Races (Circuit of Ireland International Rally) Order (Northern Ireland) 2011 (S.R. 2011 No. 177)
 The Parking Places (Disabled Persons’ Vehicles) (Amendment No. 4) Order (Northern Ireland) 2011 (S.R. 2011 No. 178)
 The Roads (Speed Limit) Order (Northern Ireland) 2011 (S.R. 2011 No. 179)
 The Road Races (Tandragee 100) Order (Northern Ireland) 2011 (S.R. 2011 No. 180)
 The Road Races (Sperrins Stages Rally) Order (Northern Ireland) 2011 (S.R. 2011 No. 181)
 The Coroners and Justice Act 2009 (Commencement No. 1) (Northern Ireland) Order 2011 (S.R. 2011 No. 182 (C. 10))
 The Road Races (North West 200) Order (Northern Ireland) 2011 (S.R. 2011 No. 183)
 The Road Races (Gortin Hill Climb) Order (Northern Ireland) 2011 (S.R. 2011 No. 184)
 The Cycle Routes (Amendment) Order (Northern Ireland) 2011 (S.R. 2011 No. 185)
 The Colin Road, Belfast (Abandonment) Order (Northern Ireland) 2011 (S.R. 2011 No. 186)
 The Lisburn Road, Ballynahinch (Abandonment) Order (Northern Ireland) 2011 (S.R. 2011 No. 187)
 The Carryduff Road, Temple (Abandonment) Order (Northern Ireland) 2011 (S.R. 2011 No. 188)
 The Shipquay Place, Londonderry (Footway) (Abandonment) Order (Northern Ireland) 2011 (S.R. 2011 No. 189)
 The Private Access at No. 168 Dublin Road, Loughbrickland (Stopping-Up) Order (Northern Ireland) 2011 (S.R. 2011 No. 190)
 The Road Races (Bush, Dungannon) Order (Northern Ireland) 2011 (S.R. 2011 No. 191)
 The Road Races (Cairncastle Hill Climb) Order (Northern Ireland) 2011 (S.R. 2011 No. 192)
 The Parking Places on Roads (Londonderry) Order (Northern Ireland) 2011 (S.R. 2011 No. 193)
 The Prohibition of Waiting (Amendment) Order (Northern Ireland) 2011 (S.R. 2011 No. 194)
 The Parking and Waiting Restrictions (Ballymena) (Amendment) Order (Northern Ireland) 2011 (S.R. 2011 No. 195)
 The Parking Places on Roads (Strabane) (Amendment) Order (Northern Ireland) 2011 (S.R. 2011 No. 196)
 The Waiting Restrictions (Bushmills) (Amendment) Order (Northern Ireland) 2011 (S.R. 2011 No. 197)
 The Waiting Restrictions (Newry) (Amendment) Order (Northern Ireland) 2011 (S.R. 2011 No. 198)
 The Parking Places and Loading Bay on Roads (Limavady) (Amendment) Order (Northern Ireland) 2011 (S.R. 2011 No. 199)
 The Cycle Routes (Amendment No. 2) Order (Northern Ireland) 2011 (S.R. 2011 No. 200)

201-300 

 The Prohibition of Traffic (Dunluce Street, Larne) (Revocation) Order (Northern Ireland) 2011 (S.R. 2011 No. 201)
 The Parking Places on Roads (Larne) Order (Northern Ireland) 2011 (S.R. 2011 No. 202)
 The Loading Bays on Roads (Amendment No. 3) Order (Northern Ireland) 2011 (S.R. 2011 No. 203)
 The Waiting Restrictions (Larne) Order (Northern Ireland) 2011 (S.R. 2011 No. 204)
 The Taxis (Larne) Order (Northern Ireland) 2011 (S.R. 2011 No. 205)
 Dundrod Circuit (Admission Charges) Regulations (Northern Ireland) 2011 (S.R. 2011 No. 206)
 The A25 Newtown Road, Camlough (Abandonment) Order (Northern Ireland) 2011 (S.R. 2011 No. 207)
 The Rules of the Court of Judicature (Northern Ireland) (Amendment No.2) 2011 (S.R. 2011 No. 208)
 Tourist Establishments (Notices, Certificates and Forms) Regulations (Northern Ireland) 2011 (S.R. 2011 No. 209)
 The Environmental Liability (Prevention and Remediation) (Amendment) Regulations (Northern Ireland) 2011 (S.R. 2011 No. 210)
 Groundwater (Amendment) Regulations (Northern Ireland) 2011 (S.R. 2011 No. 211)
 The Pollution Prevention and Control (Amendment) Regulations (Northern Ireland) 2011 (S.R. 2011 No. 212)
 The Welfare Reform (2010 Act) (Commencement No. 3) Order (Northern Ireland) 2011 (S.R. 2011 No. 213 (C. 11))
 Registered Rents (Increase) Order (Northern Ireland) 2011 (S.R. 2011 No. 214)
 The Wildlife and Natural Environment (2011 Act) (Commencement No.1) Order (Northern Ireland) 2011 (S.R. 2011 No. 215 (C. 12))
 The Conservation (Natural Habitats, etc.) (Amendment) Regulations (Northern Ireland) 2011 (S.R. 2011 No. 216)
 The Food Additives (Amendment) (No.2) Regulations (Northern Ireland) 2011 (S.R. 2011 No. 217)
 The Road Races (Eagles Rock Hill Climb) Order (Northern Ireland) 2011 (S.R. 2011 No. 218)
 The Road Races (Benbradagh Hill Climb) Order (Northern Ireland) 2011 (S.R. 2011 No. 219)
 The Road Races (Craigantlet Hill Climb) Order (Northern Ireland) 2011 (S.R. 2011 No. 220)
 The Road Races (Armoy Motorcycle Race) Order (Northern Ireland) 2011 (S.R. 2011 No. 221)
 The Employment Act (Northern Ireland) 2010 (Commencement and Transitional Provision) Order (Northern Ireland) 2011 (S.R. 2011 No. 222 (C. 13))
 Marketing of Potatoes (Amendment) Regulations (Northern Ireland) 2011 (S.R. 2011 No. 223)
 The Justice (2011 Act) (Commencement No. 1) Order (Northern Ireland) 2011 (S.R. 2011 No. 224 (C. 14))
 The Magistrates’ Courts (Civil Jurisdiction and Judgments Act 1982) (Amendment) Rules (Northern Ireland) 2011 (S.R. 2011 No. 225)
 The Child Support and Social Security (Miscellaneous Amendments) Regulations (Northern Ireland) 2011 (S.R. 2011 No. 226)
 The Local Government (Miscellaneous Provisions) (2010 Act) (Commencement) Order (Northern Ireland) 2011 (S.R. 2011 No. 227 (C. 15))
 The Local Government (Contracts) Regulations (Northern Ireland) 2011 (S.R. 2011 No. 228)
 The Rules of the Court of Judicature (Northern Ireland) (Amendment No.3) 2011 (S.R. 2011 No. 229)
 The Crown Court (Amendment) Rules (Northern Ireland) 2011 (S.R. 2011 No. 230)
 The Social Security (Industrial Injuries) (Prescribed Diseases) (Amendment) Regulations (Northern Ireland) 2011 (S.R. 2011 No. 231)
 The Waste (Fees and Charges etc.) (Amendment) Regulations (Northern Ireland) 2011 (S.R. 2011 No. 232)
 The Plant Health (Amendment No. 2) Order (Northern Ireland) 2011 (S.R. 2011 No. 233)
 The Strategic Investment and Regeneration of Sites (Maze/Long Kesh Development Corporation) Order (Northern Ireland) 2011 (S.R. 2011 No. 234)
 The Passenger and Goods Vehicles (Community Recording Equipment Regulation) Regulations (Northern Ireland) 2011 (S.R. 2011 No. 235)
 The Plastic Kitchenware (Conditions on Imports from China) Regulations (Northern Ireland) 2011 (S.R. 2011 No. 236)
 The Industrial Court (Membership) Regulations (Northern Ireland) 2011 (S.R. 2011 No. 237)
 The Chemical Analysis of Water Status (Technical Specifications) Regulations (Northern Ireland) 2011 (S.R. 2011 No. 238)
 The Controls on Ozone-Depleting Substances Regulations (Northern Ireland) 2011 (S.R. 2011 No. 239)
 The Ozone-Depleting Substances (Qualifications) Regulations (Northern Ireland) 2011 (S.R. 2011 No. 240)
 The Housing (Amendment) (2011 Act) (Commencement) Order (Northern Ireland) 2011 (S.R. 2011 No. 241 (C. 16))
 The Road Traffic Fixed Penalties (Enforcement of Fines) (Amendment) Regulations (Northern Ireland) 2011 (S.R. 2011 No. 242)
 The Family Proceedings (Amendment No. 2) Rules (Northern Ireland) 2011 (S.R. 2011 No. 243)
 The Divorce and Dissolution etc. (Pension Protection Fund) Regulations (Northern Ireland) 2011 (S.R. 2011 No. 244)
 The Welfare of Animals (2011 Act) (Commencement and Transitional Provisions No.1) Order (Northern Ireland) 2011 (S.R. 2011 No. 245 (C. 17))
 The Loading Bays on Roads (Amendment No. 4) Order (Northern Ireland) 2011 (S.R. 2011 No. 246)
 Electricity (Published Criteria for Generating Station) Regulations (Northern Ireland) 2011 (S.R. 2011 No. 247)
 Eggs and Chicks (Amendment) Regulations (Northern Ireland) 2011 (S.R. 2011 No. 248)
 The Industrial Training Levy (Construction Industry) Order (Northern Ireland) 2011 (S.R. 2011 No. 249)
 The Road Races (Ulster Grand Prix Bike Week) Order (Northern Ireland) 2011 (S.R. 2011 No. 250)
 The Road Races (Mid-Antrim 150) Order (Northern Ireland) 2011 (S.R. 2011 No. 251)
 The Road Races (Garron Point Hill Climb) Order (Northern Ireland) 2011 (S.R. 2011 No. 252)
 The Parking Places on Roads (Lisburn) Order (Northern Ireland) 2011 (S.R. 2011 No. 253)
 The Prohibition of Right-Hand Turn (Enniskillen) Order (Northern Ireland) 2011 (S.R. 2011 No. 254)
 The One-Way Traffic (Ballymoney) (Amendment) Order (Northern Ireland) 2011 (S.R. 2011 No. 255)
 The Health and Personal Social Services (Superannuation), Health and Social Care (Pension Scheme) (Amendment) Regulations (Northern Ireland) 2011 (S.R. 2011 No. 256)
 The Parking and Waiting Restrictions (Moy) Order (Northern Ireland) 2011 (S.R. 2011 No. 257)
 The Animal By-Products (Enforcement) (Amendment) Regulations (Northern Ireland) 2011 (S.R. 2011 No. 258)
 The Parking Places (Disabled Persons’ Vehicles) (Amendment No. 5) Order (Northern Ireland) 2011 (S.R. 2011 No. 259)
 The Welfare Reform (2007 Act) (Commencement No. 9) Order (Northern Ireland) 2011 (S.R. 2011 No. 260 (C. 18))
 The Railways (Safety Management) (Amendment) Regulations (Northern Ireland) 2011 (S.R. 2011 No. 261)
 The Further Education (Student Support) (Eligibility) Regulations (Northern Ireland) 2011 (S.R. 2011 No. 262)
 The Foyle Area and Carlingford Area (Prohibition of Unlicensed Fishing) (Prescribed Species) Regulations 2011 (S.R. 2011 No. 263)
 The Charities (Interim Manager) Regulations (Northern Ireland) 2011 (S.R. 2011 No. 264)
 The Employment and Support Allowance (Work-related Activity) Regulations (Northern Ireland) 2011 (S.R. 2011 No. 265)
 The Road Races (Ulster Rally) Order (Northern Ireland) 2011 (S.R. 2011 No. 266)
 The Parking Places on Roads (Newry) (Amendment) Order (Northern Ireland) 2011 (S.R. 2011 No. 267)
 The Parking and Waiting Restrictions (Irvinestown) Order (Northern Ireland) 2011 (S.R. 2011 No. 268)
 The Prohibition of Traffic (North Belfast) Order (Northern Ireland) 2011 (S.R. 2011 No. 269)
 The Prohibition of Traffic (Ardoyne, Belfast) Order (Northern Ireland) 2011 (S.R. 2011 No. 270)
 The Road Races (Spelga Hill Climb) Order (Northern Ireland) 2011 (S.R. 2011 No. 271)
 The Road Races (Croft Hill Climb) Order (Northern Ireland) 2011 (S.R. 2011 No. 272)
 The Parking Places (Disabled Persons’ Vehicles) (Amendment No. 6) Order (Northern Ireland) 2011 (S.R. 2011 No. 273)
 The Parking Places (Disabled Persons’ Vehicles) (Amendment No. 7) Order (Northern Ireland) 2011 (S.R. 2011 No. 274)
 The Eskragh Road (U1104), Granville, Dungannon (Stopping-Up) Order (Northern Ireland) 2011 (S.R. 2011 No. 275)
 The  Road, Draperstown (Abandonment) Order (Northern Ireland) 2011 (S.R. 2011 No. 276)
 The Additional Statutory Paternity Pay (General) (Amendment) Regulations (Northern Ireland) 2011 (S.R. 2011 No. 277)
 The Dogs (Fixed Penalty) Regulations (Northern Ireland) 2011 (S.R. 2011 No. 278)
 The Dogs (Licensing and Identification) Regulations (Northern Ireland) 2011 (S.R. 2011 No. 279)
 The Occupational Pension Schemes (Assignment, Forfeiture, Bankruptcy etc.) (Amendment) Regulations (Northern Ireland) 2011 (S.R. 2011 No. 280)
 The Dogs (Amendment) (2011 Act) (Commencement No.1) Order (Northern Ireland) 2011 (S.R. 2011 No. 281 (C. 19))
 The Parking and Waiting Restrictions (Belfast) (Amendment) Order (Northern Ireland) 2011 (S.R. 2011 No. 282)
 The Factories Act (Northern Ireland) 1965 and Office and Shop Premises Act (Northern Ireland) 1966 (Repeals and Modifications) Regulations (Northern Ireland) 2011 (S.R. 2011 No. 283)
 The Extraction Solvents in Food (Amendment) Regulations (Northern Ireland) 2011 (S.R. 2011 No. 284)
 The Wildlife and Natural Environment (2011 Act) (Commencement No.2) Order (Northern Ireland) 2011 (S.R. 2011 No. 285 (C. 20))
 The Road Traffic (2007 Order) (Commencement No. 7) Order (Northern Ireland) 2011 (S.R. 2011 No. 286 (C. 21))
 The Road Traffic (Fixed Penalty) (Offences) (Amendment) Order (Northern Ireland) 2011 (S.R. 2011 No. 287)
 The Road Traffic (Fixed Penalty) (Amendment) Order (Northern Ireland) 2011 (S.R. 2011 No. 288)
 The Radioactive Substances Exemption (Northern Ireland) Order 2011 (S.R. 2011 No. 289)
 The Radioactive Substances Act 1993 (Amendment) Regulations (Northern Ireland) 2011 (S.R. 2011 No. 290)
 The Social Security (Loss of Benefit) (Amendment) Regulations (Northern Ireland) 2011 (S.R. 2011 No. 291)
 The Medicines (Miscellaneous Amendments) Order 2011 (S.R. 2011 No. 292)
 The Housing Benefit (Amendment No. 2) Regulations (Northern Ireland) 2011 (S.R. 2011 No. 293)
 The Bus Lanes (Shore Road, York Road and York Street, Belfast) Order (Northern Ireland) 2011 (S.R. 2011 No. 294)
 Plant Protection Products Regulations (Northern Ireland) 2011 (S.R. 2011 No. 295)
 The Social Security (Exemption from Claiming Retirement Pension) Regulations (Northern Ireland) 2011 (S.R. 2011 No. 296)
 The Foyle Area (Angling Permits) Regulations 2011 (S.R. 2011 No. 297)
 The Social Security (Electronic Communications) Order (Northern Ireland) 2011 (S.R. 2011 No. 298)
 The Loading Bays on Roads (Amendment No. 5) Order (Northern Ireland) 2011 (S.R. 2011 No. 299)
 The Roads (Speed Limit) (No. 2) Order (Northern Ireland) 2011 (S.R. 2011 No. 300)

301-400 

 The Public Service Vehicles (Amendment) Regulations (Northern Ireland) 2011 (S.R. 2011 No. 301)
 The Public Service Vehicles (Conditions of Fitness, Equipment and Use) (Amendment) Regulations (Northern Ireland) 2011 (S.R. 2011 No. 302)
 The Motor Vehicles (Construction and Use) (Amendment No. 2) Regulations (Northern Ireland) 2011 (S.R. 2011 No. 303)
 The Public Service Vehicles Accessibility (Amendment) Regulations (Northern Ireland) 2011 (S.R. 2011 No. 304)
 The Occupational Pension Schemes (Contracting-out) (Amendment) Regulations (Northern Ireland) 2011 (S.R. 2011 No. 305)
 The Local Government Finance (2011 Act) (Commencement) Order (Northern Ireland) 2011 (S.R. 2011 No. 306 (C. 22))
 The Parking Places (Disabled Persons' Vehicles) (Amendment No. 8) Order (Northern Ireland) 2011 (S.R. 2011 No. 307)
 The Waiting Restrictions (Enniskillen) (Amendment) Order (Northern Ireland) 2011 (S.R. 2011 No. 308)
 The Parking and Waiting Restrictions (Omagh) (No. 2) Order (Amendment) Order (Northern Ireland) 2011 (S.R. 2011 No. 309)
 The Waiting Restrictions (Dundonald) Order (Northern Ireland) 2011 (S.R. 2011 No. 310)
 The Control of Traffic (Bangor) (Amendment) Order (Northern Ireland) 2011 (S.R. 2011 No. 311)
 The Waste and Contaminated Land (Amendment) (2011 Act) (Commencement No. 1) Order (Northern Ireland) 2011 (S.R. 2011 No. 312 (C. 23))
 The Off-Street Parking (Amendment No. 3) Order (Northern Ireland) 2011 (S.R. 2011 No. 313)
 The Donaghadee Road, Groomsport (Abandonment) Order (Northern Ireland) 2011 (S.R. 2011 No. 314)
 Poultrymeat Regulations (Northern Ireland) 2011 (S.R. 2011 No. 315)
 The One-Way Traffic (Newtownabbey) (Amendment) Order (Northern Ireland) 2011 (S.R. 2011 No. 316)
 The Parking Places on Roads (Newtownabbey) Order (Northern Ireland) 2011 (S.R. 2011 No. 317)
 The Waiting Restrictions (Newtownabbey) (Amendment) Order (Northern Ireland) 2011 (S.R. 2011 No. 318)
 The Parking Places on Roads (Glengormley) Order (Northern Ireland) 2011 (S.R. 2011 No. 319)
 The Healthy Start Scheme and Day Care Food Scheme (Amendment No.2) Regulations (Northern Ireland) 2011 (S.R. 2011 No. 320)
 The Bus Lane (Victoria Street, Belfast) Order (Northern Ireland) 2011 (S.R. 2011 No. 321)
 The Parking Places, Loading Bays and Waiting Restrictions (Coleraine) Order (Northern Ireland) 2011 (S.R. 2011 No. 322)
 The Civil Registration (2011 Act) (Commencement No1) Order (Northern Ireland) 2011 (S.R. 2011 No. 323 (C. 24))
 Fisheries (Amendment) Regulations (Northern Ireland) 2011 (S.R. 2011 No. 324)
 Eel Fishing (Amendment) Regulations (Northern Ireland) 2011 (S.R. 2011 No. 325)
 Local Government (Capital Finance and Accounting) Regulations (Northern Ireland) 2011 (S.R. 2011 No. 326)
 The Health and Personal Social Services (General Medical Services Contracts)(Prescription of Drugs Etc.) (Amendment) Regulations (Northern Ireland) 2011 (S.R. 2011 No. 327)
 The Motor Vehicles (Construction and Use) (Amendment No. 3) Regulations (Northern Ireland) 2011 (S.R. 2011 No. 328)
 The Road Vehicles Lighting (Amendment No. 3) Regulations (Northern Ireland) 2011 (S.R. 2011 No. 329)
 The Price Marking (Amendment) Order (Northern Ireland) 2011 (S.R. 2011 No. 330)
 The Weights and Measures (Packaged Goods) Regulations (Northern Ireland) 2011 (S.R. 2011 No. 331)
 The Dogs (Amendment) (2011 Act) (Commencement No.2) Order (Northern Ireland) 2011 (S.R. 2011 No. 332 (C. 25))
 The Cycle Routes (Amendment No. 3) Order (Northern Ireland) 2011 (S.R. 2011 No. 333)
 The Waiting Restrictions (Newry) (No. 2) Order (Northern Ireland) 2011 (S.R. 2011 No. 334)
 The Waiting Restrictions (Dungannon) (Amendment) Order (Northern Ireland) 2011 (S.R. 2011 No. 335)
 The Route F1361 Hawthorn Walk (Footpath), Highfield Heights, Craigavon (Abandonment) Order (Northern Ireland) 2011 (S.R. 2011 No. 336)
 The Orchard Drive, Portadown (Footway) (Abandonment) Order (Northern Ireland) 2011 (S.R. 2011 No. 337)
 The Housing Executive (Indemnities for Members and Officers) Order (Northern Ireland) 2011 (S.R. 2011 No. 338)
 The Homeless Persons Advice and Assistance Regulations (Northern Ireland) 2011 (S.R. 2011 No. 339)
 The Trunk Road T10 (Shannaragh Realignment) Order (Northern Ireland) 2011 (S.R. 2011 No. 340)
 The Dogwood Walk Footpath, Route F1386, Craigavon (Abandonment) Order (Northern Ireland) 2011 (S.R. 2011 No. 341)
 The Old Mill Heights, Millbrook, Larne (Abandonment) Order (Northern Ireland) 2011 (S.R. 2011 No. 342)
 The Footpath between Ballymacash Road and Prince William Road, Lisburn (Abandonment) Order (Northern Ireland) 2011 (S.R. 2011 No. 343)
 The Hanover Glen, Bangor (Abandonment) Order (Northern Ireland) 2011 (S.R. 2011 No. 344)
 The Former Road (including footpath) at the Westlink, Belfast (Abandonment) Order (Northern Ireland) 2011 (S.R. 2011 No. 345)
 The Ballyblaugh Road, Newry (Abandonment) Order (Northern Ireland) 2011 (S.R. 2011 No. 346)
 The Registration of Deeds (Fees) Order (Northern Ireland) 2011 (S.R. 2011 No. 347)
 Land Registry (Fees) Order (Northern Ireland) 2011 (S.R. 2011 No. 348)
 Cattle Identification (Notification of Births, Deaths and Movements) (Amendment) Regulations (Northern Ireland) 2011 (S.R. 2011 No. 349)
 THE AGENCY WORKERS REGULATIONS (NORTHERN IRELAND) 2011 (S.R. 2011 No. 350)
 The Seed Potatoes (Amendment) Regulations (Northern Ireland) 2011 (S.R. 2011 No. 351)
 The Plant Health (Amendment No.3) Order (Northern Ireland) 2011 (S.R. 2011 No. 352)
 The Cycle Routes (Amendment No. 4) Order (Northern Ireland) 2011 (S.R. 2011 No. 353)
 The Prohibition of Traffic (Thorndale Avenue, Belfast) Order (Northern Ireland) 2011 (S.R. 2011 No. 354)
 The Parking Places (Disabled Persons’ Vehicles) (Amendment No. 9) Order (Northern Ireland) 2011 (S.R. 2011 No. 355)
 The Social Security (Disability Living Allowance, Attendance Allowance and Carer’s Allowance) (Miscellaneous Amendments) Regulations (Northern Ireland) 2011 (S.R. 2011 No. 356)
 The Social Security (Miscellaneous Amendments No. 2) Regulations (Northern Ireland) 2011 (S.R. 2011 No. 357)
 The Extinguishment of Right to Use Vehicles on Roads (Strabane) Order (Northern Ireland) 2011 (S.R. 2011 No. 358)
 The Prohibition of Traffic (Avoniel, Belfast) Order (Northern Ireland) 2011 (S.R. 2011 No. 359)
 The Fire and Rescue Services (Emergencies) Order (Northern Ireland) 2011 (S.R. 2011 No. 360)
 The Waiting Restrictions (Newry) (2011 Order) (Amendment) Order (Northern Ireland) 2011 (S.R. 2011 No. 361)
 The Parking Places on Roads Castlecaulfield) Order (Northern Ireland) 2011 (S.R. 2011 No. 362)
 The Foyle Area and Carlingford Area (Tagging and Logbook) (Amendment) Regulations 2011 (S.R. 2011 No. 363)
 The M1/Trunk Road T3 (Motorway Service Area) Order (Northern Ireland) 2011 (S.R. 2011 No. 364)
 The Carriage of Dangerous Goods and Use of Transportable Pressure Equipment (Amendment) Regulations (Northern Ireland) 2011 (S.R. 2011 No. 365)
 The Control of Traffic (Armagh) Order (Northern Ireland) 2011 (S.R. 2011 No. 366)
 The Debt Relief Orders (Designation of Competent Authorities) (Amendment) Regulations (Northern Ireland) 2011 (S.R. 2011 No. 367)
 The Social Security (Work-focused Interviews for Lone Parents and Partners) (Amendment) Regulations (Northern Ireland) 2011 (S.R. 2011 No. 368)
 The Student Fees (Amounts) (Amendment) (No. 2) Regulations (Northern Ireland) 2011 (S.R. 2011 No. 369)
 The Justice (2011 Act) (Commencement No. 2) Order (Northern Ireland) 2011 (S.R. 2011 No. 370 (C. 26))
 Criminal Justice (Northern Ireland) Order 2008 (Commencement No. 7) Order 2011 (S.R. 2011 No. 371 (C. 27))
 The Further Education Teachers’ (Eligibility) (Amendment) Regulations (Northern Ireland) 2011 (S.R. 2011 No. 372)
 The Landfill Allowances Scheme (Amendment) Regulations (Northern Ireland) 2011 (S.R. 2011 No. 373)
 The Smoke Control Areas (Authorised Fuels) Regulations (Northern Ireland) 2011 (S.R. 2011 No. 374)
 The Local Government (Rates Support Grant) Regulations (Northern Ireland) 2011 (S.R. 2011 No. 375)
 The Student Fees (Qualifying Courses and Persons) (Amendment) (No. 2) Regulations (Northern Ireland) 2011 (S.R. 2011 No. 376)
 The Rates (Information Requirement) (Appointed Day) Order (Northern Ireland) 2011 (S.R. 2011 No. 377)
 The Rates (Appeals) (Amendment) Regulations (Northern Ireland) 2011 (S.R. 2011 No. 378)
 The Road Traffic (Fixed Penalty) (Offences) (Amendment No. 2) Order (Northern Ireland) 2011 (S.R. 2011 No. 379)
 The Crossbill Place, Lisburn (Footpaths) (Abandonment) Order (Northern Ireland) 2011 (S.R. 2011 No. 380)
 The Lagmore Road, Lisburn (Abandonment) Order (Northern Ireland) 2011 (S.R. 2011 No. 381)
 The Parking Places on Roads (Whiteabbey) Order (Northern Ireland) 2011 (S.R. 2011 No. 382)
 The Social Fund (Cold Weather Payments) (General) (Amendment) Regulations (Northern Ireland) 2011 (S.R. 2011 No. 383)
 The Plant Health (Import Inspection Fees) (Amendment) Regulations (Northern Ireland) 2011 (S.R. 2011 No. 384)
 Control of Pollution (Oil Storage) (Amendment) Regulations (Northern Ireland) 2011 (S.R. 2011 No. 385)
 The Planning (2011 Act) (Commencement No.1) Order (Northern Ireland) 2011 (S.R. 2011 No. 386 (C. 28))
 The Planning (2011 Act) (Transitional Provisions) Order (Northern Ireland) 2011 (S.R. 2011 No. 387)
 The Nitrates Action Programme (Amendment) Regulations (Northern Ireland) 2011 (S.R. 2011 No. 388)
 The Insolvency Practitioners and Insolvency Account (Fees) (Amendment) Order (Northern Ireland) 2011 (S.R. 2011 No. 389)
 The Insolvency (Fees) (Amendment No. 2) Order (Northern Ireland) 2011 (S.R. 2011 No. 390)
 The Insolvency (Deposits) (Amendment) Order (Northern Ireland) 2011 (S.R. 2011 No. 391)
 The Prohibition of Traffic (Lower Ormeau, Belfast) (Amendment) Order (Northern Ireland) 2011 (S.R. 2011 No. 392)
 The Prohibition of Traffic (The Mount and Willowfield, Belfast) (Amendment) Order (Northern Ireland) 2011 (S.R. 2011 No. 393)
 The Ballyrobin Road (Route C28), Templepatrick (Abandonment) Order (Northern Ireland) 2011 (S.R. 2011 No. 394)
 The Rates (Payments by Owners by Agreement) (Amendment) Order (Northern Ireland) 2011 (S.R. 2011 No. 395)
 The Legal Aid in Criminal Proceedings (Costs) (Amendment) Rules (Northern Ireland) 2011 (S.R. 2011 No. 396)
 The Fodder Plant Seeds (Amendment) Regulations (Northern Ireland) 2011 (S.R. 2011 No. 397)
 The Planning (Fees) (Amendment No. 2) Regulations (Northern Ireland) 2011 (S.R. 2011 No. 398)
 The One-Way Traffic (Belfast) (Amendment No. 3) Order (Northern Ireland) 2011 (S.R. 2011 No. 399)
 The Parking and Waiting Restrictions (Strabane) Order (Northern Ireland) 2011 (S.R. 2011 No. 400)

401-500 

 The Roads (Speed Limit) (No. 3) Order (Northern Ireland) 2011 (S.R. 2011 No. 401)
 The Pollution Prevention and Control (Amendment No.2) Regulations (Northern Ireland) 2011 (S.R. 2011 No. 402)
 The Waste Management Licensing (Amendment) Regulations (Northern Ireland) 2011 (S.R. 2011 No. 403)
 The Planning (General Development) (Amendment No. 2) Order (Northern Ireland) 2011 (S.R. 2011 No. 404)
 The Banning Orders (Prescribed Persons) Order (Northern Ireland) 2011 (S.R. 2011 No. 405)
 The Education (2006 Order) (Commencement No.3) Order (Northern Ireland) 2011 (S.R. 2011 No. 406 (C. 29))
 The Welfare of Animals (Slaughter or Killing) (Amendment) Regulations (Northern Ireland) 2011 (S.R. 2011 No. 407)
 Police Service of Northern Ireland and Police Service of Northern Ireland Reserve (Full-Time) (Severance) (Amendment) Regulations 2011 (S.R. 2011 No. 408)
 The Damages (Asbestos-related Conditions) (2011 Act) (Commencement) Order (Northern Ireland) 2011 (S.R. 2011 No. 409 (C. 30))
 Superannuation (Commissioner for Older People for Northern Ireland) Order (Northern Ireland) 2011 (S.R. 2011 No. 410)
 The Labour Relations Agency (Code of Practice on Disciplinary and Grievance Procedures) (Jurisdictions) Order (Northern Ireland) 2011 (S.R. 2011 No. 411)
 The Loading Bays on Roads (Amendment No. 6) Order (Northern Ireland) 2011 (S.R. 2011 No. 412)
 The One-Way Traffic (Belfast) (Amendment No. 4) Order (Northern Ireland) 2011 (S.R. 2011 No. 413)
 The Taxis (Enniskillen) (Amendment) Order (Northern Ireland) 2011 (S.R. 2011 No. 414)
 The Occupational Pensions (Revaluation) Order (Northern Ireland) 2011 (S.R. 2011 No. 415)
 The Goods Vehicles (Testing) (Amendment) Regulations (Northern Ireland) 2011 (S.R. 2011 No. 416)
 The Magistrates’ Courts (Banning Orders) Rules (Northern Ireland) 2011 (S.R. 2011 No. 417)
 The Magistrates’ Courts (Amendment No. 2) Rules (Northern Ireland) 2011 (S.R. 2011 No. 418)
 The Criminal Appeal (Prosecution Appeals) (Banning Orders) Rules (Northern Ireland) 2011 (S.R. 2011 No. 419)
 The Crown Court (Amendment No. 2) Rules (Northern Ireland) 2011 (S.R. 2011 No. 420)
 The County Court (Amendment No. 3) Rules (Northern Ireland) 2011 (S.R. 2011 No. 421)
 The Rules of the Court of Judicature (Northern Ireland) (Amendment No.4) 2011 (S.R. 2011 No. 422)
 The Drumnabreeze Road and Lough Road, Gamblestown, Donaghcloney (Abandonment) Order (Northern Ireland) 2011 (S.R. 2011 No. 423)
 The Parking and Waiting Restrictions (Portadown) Order (Northern Ireland) 2011 (S.R. 2011 No. 424)
 The Parking Places on Roads (Lisburn) (No. 2) Order (Northern Ireland) 2011 (S.R. 2011 No. 425)
 The Shipquay Place, Londonderry (No. 2) (Footway) (Abandonment) Order (Northern Ireland) 2011 (S.R. 2011 No. 426)
 The Employer’s Liability (Compulsory Insurance) (Amendment) Regulations (Northern Ireland) 2011 (S.R. 2011 No. 427)
 The Criminal Justice Act 1988 (Reviews of Sentencing) Order (Northern Ireland) 2011 (S.R. 2011 No. 428)
 The Less Favoured Area Compensatory Allowances Regulations (Northern Ireland) 2011 (S.R. 2011 No. 429)
 The Welfare Reform (2010 Act) (Commencement No. 4) Order (Northern Ireland) 2011 (S.R. 2011 No. 430 (C. 31))
 The Social Security (Electronic Communications) (No. 2) Order (Northern Ireland) 2011 (S.R. 2011 No. 431)
 The Motor Vehicles (Access to Driver Licensing Records) Regulations (Northern Ireland) 2011 (S.R. 2011 No. 432)
 The Road Traffic (2007 Order) (Commencement No. 8) Order (Northern Ireland) 2011 (S.R. 2011 No. 433 (C. 32))
 The Social Security (Contribution Conditions for Jobseeker’s Allowance and Employment and Support Allowance) Regulations (Northern Ireland) 2011 (S.R. 2011 No. 434)
 The Northern Ireland Poultry Health Assurance Scheme (Fees) Order (Northern Ireland) 2011 (S.R. 2011 No. 435)
 The Northern Ireland Poultry Health Assurance Scheme Order (Northern Ireland) 2011 (S.R. 2011 No. 436)
 The Zoonoses (Amendment) Order (Northern Ireland) 2011 (S.R. 2011 No. 437)
 The Trade in Animals and Related Products Regulations (Northern Ireland) 2011 (S.R. 2011 No. 438)
 The Roads (Speed Limit) (No. 4) Order (Northern Ireland) 2011 (S.R. 2011 No. 439)
 The Non-Commercial Movement of Pet Animals Order (Northern Ireland) 2011 (S.R. 2011 No. 440)
 The Pensions (2008 No. 2 Act) (Commencement No. 6) Order (Northern Ireland) 2011 (S.R. 2011 No. 441 (C. 33))
 The Medicines Act 1968 (Pharmacy) Order 2011 (S.R. 2011 No. 442)

References 

2011
2011 in Northern Ireland
Northern Ireland Statutory Rules